Czyżów Szlachecki is a village in the administrative district of Gmina Zawichost, within Sandomierz County, Świętokrzyskie Voivodeship, in south-central Poland. The Czyżów Szlachecki Castle is located in the village.

References

Villages in Sandomierz County